The Pittsburgh Force is an inactive women's American Football team based in Pittsburgh, Pennsylvania.  Home games were last played at William V. Campbell Athletic Field in nearby Munhall.

In the early planning stages, the Force was originally planning to play in the National Women's Football Association, but after the NWFA folded, they decided to join the upstart Women's Football Alliance.

History
In 2008, Robert Gold was selected as the team's first head coach. They held tryouts in Ambridge, Cranberry, and Chartiers Valley for their inaugural 2009 season.  From 2009 to 2011 they played their home games at Rubenstein Stadium in suburban Ambridge, Pennsylvania.  In 2012, the Force moved their home field to William V. Campbell Athletic Field in suburban Munhall, Pennsylvania.  In 2013, the Force went on a re-building hiatus.  They returned for the 2014 season in the WFA.

Coaches W/L Records:

Robert Gold	      (2009)	        2-6 
Tim Schaup	      (2010)	        1-2 
Jason Mignanelli     (2010)	        4-1
Adam Santuro	      (2011)	        1-5
Kathy Ferrari	      (2011-2014)       6-10

Season-by-season

|-
|2009 || 2 || 6 || 0 || 4th National Mid-Atlantic || --
|-
|2010 || 5 || 3 || 0 || 2nd National Mid-Atlantic || --
|-
|2011 || 2 || 6 || 0 || 4th National Mid-Atlantic || --
|-
|2012  || 1 || 7 || 0 || 3rd National Division 4  || --
|-
|2014  || 4 || 2 || 0 || 3rd Northeast Division   || --
|-
!Total || 14 || 24 || 0
|colspan="2"|

Roster

2009

Season schedule

2010

Season schedule

2011

Season schedule

Note:  Erie was disqualified for the season and forfeited their wins against the Pittsburgh Force.

2012

Season schedule

2014

Season schedule

External links
Pittsburgh Force official website
 http://www.bizjournals.com/pittsburgh/stories/2008/03/10/daily3.html

Women's Football Alliance teams
American football teams in Pittsburgh
American football teams established in 2009
Women's sports in Pennsylvania